Ceroxylon parvifrons, also known as the Golden wax palm is a species of Ceroxylon from Colombia, Venezuela, Ecuador, Peru, and Bolivia.

References

External links
 
 

parvifrons